Josh Harvey-Clemons (born February 20, 1994) is an American football linebacker for the Orlando Guardians of the XFL. He played college football at Georgia and Louisville and was drafted by the Washington Redskins in the seventh round of the 2017 NFL Draft.

Professional career

Washington Redskins / Football Team
Harvey-Clemons was drafted by the Washington Redskins in the seventh round (230th overall) of the 2017 NFL Draft. In his rookie year, he played 10 games primarily as a backup at inside linebacker. He recorded 10 tackles, half a sack, and a pass deflection. Harvey-Clemons opted out of the 2020 season due to concerns about the COVID-19 pandemic as he and his two sons have asthma. 

Harvey-Clemons was released on May 19, 2021.

Miami Dolphins
Harvey-Clemons signed with the Miami Dolphins on August 19, 2021. Harvey-Clemons was released on August 31 during final roster cuts.

Montreal Alouettes
On February 3, 2022, Harvey-Clemons signed with the Montreal Alouettes. He played in five regular season games where he had two special teams tackles before being released on September 4, 2022.

Orlando Guardians
The Orlando Guardians selected Harvey-Clemons in the fourth round of the 2023 XFL Supplemental Draft on January 1, 2023.

See also
 Prayer at Jordan–Hare

References

External links
 Louisville Cardinals bio
 Montreal Alouettes bio

1994 births
Living people
Players of American football from Georgia (U.S. state)
People from Valdosta, Georgia
American football safeties
American football linebackers
Louisville Cardinals football players
Georgia Bulldogs football players
Washington Redskins players
Washington Football Team players
Miami Dolphins players
Montreal Alouettes players
Orlando Guardians players